Alex Pheby (born 1970) is a British author and academic. He is currently a professor at Newcastle University and lives in Scotland. He studied at Manchester University, Manchester Metropolitan University, Goldsmiths. and UEA.

Career 
Pheby's second novel, Playthings, was described as "the best neuro-novel ever written" in Literary Review. The novel deals with the true case of Daniel Paul Schreber, a 19th-century German judge affected by schizophrenia, who was committed to an asylum. In 2016, Playthings was shortlisted for the £30,000 Wellcome Book Prize. His third novel, Lucia,, concerning the suspected schizophrenic daughter of James Joyce, released in 2018 was joint winner of the Republic of Consciousness Prize. He is also the author of Grace, published by Two Ravens Press.

Mordew, published in 2020 by Galley Beggar Press, is the first of a trilogy of fantasy novels. Critics have praised the world building, the balance between "invention and familiarity", and described the novel as "dizzying".

Bibliography
2014: Afterimages of Schreber
2015: Playthings
2018: Lucia
2020: Mordew (Cities of the Weft #1)
2022: Malarkoi (Cities of the Weft #2)
TBC: Waterblack (Cities of the Weft #3)

References

1970 births
Living people
21st-century British novelists
Academics of the University of Greenwich
Alumni of the University of East Anglia
Postmodern writers
British fantasy writers